The , abbreviated NIAD-QE, is Independent Administrative Institution affiliated with the Ministry of Education, Culture, Sports, Science and Technology (MEXT), whose objectives are: 

 To evaluate education and research activities of Japanese universities and their consortia and to publish the result of the evaluation.
 To evaluate achievements of higher education-level learning outside mainstream universities and award academic degrees. 

As of July 2007, the second objective consists of:

 Accrediting the courses of some daigakkō and awarding the graduates of academic degrees. 
 Awarding bachelor's degrees to the graduates of Japanese junior colleges and kōsen (technical colleges) who did recognisable extra studies.
 Awarding degrees to the graduates of the Japan Coast Guard Academy.

It is headquartered in Kodaira, Tokyo.

History
 1991: The Study Centre for Academic Degree Awarding and Committee for Study for Creation of Academic Degree Awarding Institution was established in the Graduate University for Advanced Studies .
 1992: The NIAD was established.
 1994: The NIAD was expanded to NIAD-UE.
 2002: The first publication of the results of evaluation. 
 2003: Relocated to the current campus in Kodaira. 
 2016: The NIAD-QE was established.

See also
 List of Independent Administrative Institutions (Japan)

External links
 National Institution for Academic Degrees and Quality Enhancement of Higher Education (English)

 

Academic
2016 establishments in Japan
Organizations established in 2016